Peter Stülcken (born 2 May 1936) is a German sailor. He competed in the Dragon event at the 1968 Summer Olympics.

References

External links
 

1936 births
Living people
German male sailors (sport)
Olympic sailors of West Germany
Sailors at the 1968 Summer Olympics – Dragon
Sportspeople from Hamburg